The Dutch Basketball League (DBL) Most Valuable Player Under 23 is an award that is yearly given to the best player under age 23 in the DBL, the highest professional basketball league in the Netherlands. The award is handed out after the regular season since 2004. The award is handed out by the FEB (Federatie Eredivisie Basketbal).

Winners

References

MVP U23